Gawain and the Green Knight is a 1973 film directed by Stephen Weeks, and starring Murray Head as Gawain and Nigel Green in his final theatrical film as the Green Knight. The story is based on the medieval English tale Sir Gawain and the Green Knight and also Yvain, the Knight of the Lion by Chrétien de Troyes and the tale of Sir Gareth in Thomas Malory's Le Morte d'Arthur.

Locations used included castles at Cardiff, Caerphilly and Castell Coch, Wales; Peckforton castle, Cheshire; and St. Michael's Mount and Roche rock, Cornwall. St. Govan's chapel on the Pembrokeshire coast was also featured.

Weeks remade the film in 1984 as Sword of the Valiant with Miles O'Keeffe and Sean Connery as Gawain and the Green Knight, respectively.

Plot
The mysterious Green Knight appears before King Arthur's court in the New Year and demands the head of Sir Gawain as the prize in a bizarre game. Given a year's grace, Gawain sets off in search of the Knight for a rematch.

Cast
 Murray Head as Gawain  
 Ciaran Madden as Linet  
 Nigel Green as Green Knight  
 Anthony Sharp as King  
 Robert Hardy as Sir Bertilak  
 David Leland as Humphrey  
 Murray Melvin as Seneschal  
 Tony Steedman as Fortinbras  
 Ronald Lacey as Oswald  
 Willoughby Goddard as Knight  
 George Merritt as Old Knight  
 Pauline Letts as Lady of Lyonesse  
 Richard Hurndall as Bearded Man  
 Peter Copley as Pilgrim  
 Geoffrey Bayldon as Wiseman

See also 
List of films based on Arthurian legend

External links
 

1973 films
1970s historical fantasy films
Arthurian films
British historical fantasy films
Films based on poems
Films set in castles
United Artists films
Films scored by Ron Goodwin
1970s English-language films
Films directed by Stephen Weeks
1970s British films